Cuvio is a comune (municipality) in the Province of Varese in the Italian region Lombardy, located about  northwest of Milan and about  northwest of Varese.

Cuvio borders the following municipalities: Azzio, Barasso, Casalzuigno, Castello Cabiaglio, Cocquio-Trevisago, Comerio, Cuveglio, Gavirate, Orino.

References

Cities and towns in Lombardy